Sniper: Assassin's End is a 2020 American action film directed by Kaare Andrews and starring Chad Michael Collins, Tom Berenger and Sayaka Akimoto. The film is the eighth installment of the Sniper film series and a sequel to Sniper: Ultimate Kill (2017).

Plot
Special Ops Sniper Brandon Beckett is set up as the primary suspect for the murder of a foreign dignitary on the eve of signing a high-profile trade agreement with the United States. Narrowly escaping death, Beckett realizes that there may be a dark operative working within the government and partners with the only person whom he can trust, his father, legendary Sniper Sgt. Thomas Beckett. Both Becketts are on the run from the CIA, Russian mercenaries, and a Yakuza-trained assassin with sniper skills that rival both legendary sharpshooters.

Cast

Production
A hand double with a missing index finger plays Berenger's character in close-ups.

Release

Home media
The film was released to Blu-ray, DVD, and digital platforms on June 16, 2020,  and reached #1 on iTunes in September 2020.

References

External links
 
 

2020 action films
2020 films
American action films
Direct-to-video sequel films
Films about snipers
Films about the United States Marine Corps
Destination Films films
Ninja films
Sony Pictures direct-to-video films
Sniper (film series)
2020s American films
Yakuza films